Peel (Regional Municipality of) v Canada [1992] 3 SCR 762 is a Canadian unjust enrichment law case, concerning the nature of an enrichment.

Facts
The Juvenile Delinquents Act 1970 allowed courts to order municipalities to pay for delinquent children's accommodation in foster homes or with charities. The Regional Municipality of Peel was ordered to pay for a number of children to be placed with non-state bodies, but it protested that the orders were based on ultra vires secondary legislation and were void. It won this case, and then sought restitution from the provincial and federal governments, arguing it had discharged their liabilities.

Judgment
The Supreme Court of Canada dismissed the restitutionary claim because it had not been shown that the provincial or federal governments had been incontrovertibly benefited by the payments. No legal liability had been discharged and there had not been any inevitable or likely expense saved.

McLachlin J gave the leading judgment, holding the benefit received by the government (even if the law should be extended to that) was not incontrovertible.

La Forest J, Sopinka J, Gonthier J and Cory J concurred.

Lamer CJC gave a short concurring judgment.

See also

English unjust enrichment law

Notes

References
JR Maurice Gautreau, ‘When Are Enrichments Unjust’ (1988–89) 10 Adv Q 258, ‘While the principle of freedom of choice is ordinarily important, it loses its force if the benefit is an incontrovertible benefit, because it only makes sense that the defendant would not have realistically declined the enrichment.’ 
McInnes, ‘Incontrovertible Benefits and the Canadian Law of Restitution’ (1990–91) 12 Adv Q 323, 346, ‘although otherwise warranted, restitutionary relief should be denied if the benefit was conferred officiously, or if liability would amount to a hardship for the recipient of the benefit.’

Supreme Court of Canada cases
1992 in Canadian case law
Unjust enrichment
Regional Municipality of Peel